is a Japanese public KK company, manufacturing precision instruments, measuring instruments and medical equipment, based in Kyoto, Japan. It was established in 1875. The American arm of the company, Shimadzu Scientific Instruments, was founded in 1975.

History

Founding and early years
During the 1890s and 1900s, Shimadzu experienced rapid growth that occurred at the same time as higher education grew in Japan.

X-ray devices, the spectrum camera, the electron microscope, and the gas chromatograph were developed and commercialized in advance of other Japanese companies. Shimadzu became a corporation in 1917. The American arm of the company, Shimadzu Scientific Instruments, was founded in 1975.

Developments
The company also developed, in 2001, an ultra-high speed video camera, HyperVision HPV-1, which is capable of recording at 1,000,000 FPS, while in 2016 it released the HyperVision HPV-X2, a camera that achieves ultra-high-speed continuous recording at 10 million frames per second at Full Pixel Resolution. Other products developed by Shimadzu include head-mounted displays.

The company had revenue of ¥264.048 billion yen ($2.8 billion USD) in FY 2012, with 10,395 employees as of March 31, 2013.

Acquisition history

In 2019, Shimadzu's Medical subsidiary in USA acquired CORE Medical Imaging, Inc. to strengthen Healthcare Business in North America.

In 2018, Shimadzu acquired Infraserv Vakuumservice GmbH of Germany in order to strengthen their Turbomolecular Pump Sales and Service Capabilities in Europe.

In 2017, Shimadzu acquired AlsaChim, a specialist for high-quality analytical isotope labeled standards.

In 1989, Shimadzu Corporation acquired Kratos Group Plc. in U.K. to expand in Surface Analysis, MALD-TOF segments.

Gallery

Products

Buildings

See also

 List of companies of Japan
 List of scientific instruments manufacturers
 Medical devices
 Laboratory equipment
 Mass spectrometry

References

External links

 Official global website 
Official Japanese website 
Official Asia Pacific online webstore 

Electronics companies of Japan
Defense companies of Japan
Instrument-making corporations
Laboratory equipment manufacturers
Medical technology companies of Japan
X-ray equipment manufacturers
Research support companies
Manufacturing companies based in Kyoto
Manufacturing companies established in 1875
Japanese companies established in 1875
Japanese brands
Companies listed on the Tokyo Stock Exchange
Companies listed on the Osaka Exchange